Mohsen Beiranvand (born 9 June 1981) is an Iranian weightlifter.

At the 2004 Summer Olympics, he participated in the 105 kg category, but failed in the snatch competition. He ranked 14th in the 105 kg category at the 2007 World Weightlifting Championships, with a total of 376 kg.

At the 2008 Summer Olympics, he ranked 10th in the 105 kg category, with a total of 390 kg.

Notes and references
 Profile

External links
 Athlete Biography at beijing2008

1981 births
Iranian male weightlifters
Iranian strength athletes
Living people
Olympic weightlifters of Iran
Weightlifters at the 2004 Summer Olympics
Weightlifters at the 2008 Summer Olympics
21st-century Iranian people